Michel Strogoff is a 1975 French / Italian / German miniseries directed by Jean-Pierre Decourt. It is based on the novel of the same name by Jules Verne.

Cast 
 Raimund Harmstorf - Michel Strogoff
 Lorenza Guerrieri - Nadia Fedor
 Pierre Vernier - Alcide Jolivet
 Vernon Dobtcheff - Harry Blount
 Rada Rassimov - Sangarre
 Valerio Popesco - Ivan Ogareff
 József Madaras - Feofar Khan

 Tibor Molnár - Nicolas Pigassof
  - Tsar Alexander II
  - Vassili

 : Taizis
 János Kovács: Tzingos
 : tartar chief
 Károly Vogt: tartar chief
 : Marfa Strogoff
 Tibor Kenderesi: Fëdor
 : Taras
 Tibor Molnár: Nikolaj Pigasov
 Tibor Patassy: General Kissov
 : Fischer
 : Grand Duke Dimitri
 Ferenc Baracsi: General Woranzof
 István Jeney: Telegraphist

References

External links 

Michel Strogoff at AlloCiné (French)
Michel Strogoff at Wunschliste (German)

1970s German television miniseries
1970s French television miniseries
Television series set in the 19th century
Television shows set in Russia
1970s French television series
1975 French television series debuts
1976 French television series endings
1976 German television series debuts
1977 German television series endings
Television shows based on works by Jules Verne
Television shows based on French novels
ZDF original programming
Films scored by Vladimir Cosma
Films based on Michael Strogoff